The Everlovin' World of Eddy Arnold is an album by country vocalist Eddy Arnold.

The album debuted on Billboard magazine's Top Country Albums chart on February 3, 1968, held the No. 1 spot for four weeks, and remained on the chart for a total of 33 weeks. It was Arnold's ninth consecutive album to reach No. 1 on the Top Country Albums.

Track listing
 "All the Time" (Mel Tillis, Wayne Walker) (2:47)
 "In the Misty Moonlight" (Cindy Walker) (2:04)
 "There You Go" (Audrey Allison) (2:32)
 "A Song for Shara" (Demetrius Tapp, Bob Tubert) (2:26)
 "Sunny" (Bobby Hebb) (2:35)
 "Dear Heart" (Jay Livingston, Ray Evans, Henry Mancini) (2:45) (From the Warner Brothers 1964 film Dear Heart)
 "How Is She?" (Marijohn Wilkin) (2:13)
 "Here Comes Heaven" (Joy Byers, Bob Tubert) (2:14)
 "The World I Used to Know" (Rod McKuen) (3:05)
 "Secret Love" (Paul Francis Webster, Sammy Fain) (2:50)
 "Baby That's Living" (Jean Chapel) (2:30)
 "Nothing but Time" (Charlie Williams, Jill Jones) (2:45)

Personnel
Jim Malloy - engineer
Bill Walker - arranger, conductor

References

Eddy Arnold albums
1968 albums
RCA Victor albums
Albums produced by Chet Atkins